is a series of rhythm video games, that was first introduced by Konami in Japan on February 26, 1999. IIDX has since spawned 31 arcade releases and 14 console releases on the Sony PlayStation 2. It is the sequel to the beatmania game series, and part of the Bemani line of music games. A PC release titled beatmania IIDX INFINITAS has been released, beginning alpha testing in September 2015, and was heavily updated to a new version in 2020.

Gameplay

Gameplay in general

Beatmania IIDX tasks the player with performing songs through a controller consisting of seven key buttons and a scratchable turntable. Hitting the notes with strong timing increases the score and groove gauge bar, allowing the player to finish the stage. Failing to do so depletes the gauge until it is empty, abruptly ending the song.

Starting from beatmania IIDX 17 SIRIUS, two new note types are added. Charge Notes is a note that must be pressed and released on the right time, while Backspin Scratch is a scratch note which require the player to spin the disc in a direction, then spinning it in the opposite direction at the end. Both are valued two combos; one for the beginning note and one for the ending note. beatmania IIDX 23 copula introduced a variation called Hell Charge Notes, which refill the gauge when held down but rapidly deplete it when not. Unlike regular Charge Notes, they can be pressed at any time, though missing the timing window will still break the player's combo.

Difficulty
From beatmania IIDX to beatmania IIDX 4th Style, song difficulty ranged from Level 1 to Level 7. beatmania IIDX 5th Style introduced flashing Level 7s as the new top difficulty. Flashing 7s gave way to Level 8 difficulty in beatmania IIDX 10th Style, and Level 8+ was added in beatmania IIDX 11 IIDXRED. The version immediately after, beatmania IIDX 12 HAPPY SKY, introduced a new difficulty scale, from Level 1 to Level 12, which has remained the standard.

Extra stage system
Like most BEMANI titles, Beatmania IIDX has Extra Stage and One More Extra Stage songs, commonly known as ES and OMES respectively. When Extra Stage was introduced in beatmania IIDX 3rd Style, there was no new song to unlock, and the player simply got to play an extra song. beatmania IIDX 7th Style was the first to have an unlockable song only available on Extra Stage, and also introduced the One More Extra Stage. Obtaining the secret ES and OMES required meeting certain requirements during a session of play. beatmania IIDX 13 DistorteD was the first title with an Extra Stage system exclusive to players using an e-AMUSEMENT pass; it also included multiple Extra Stages that had to be cleared under certain requirements to unlock the One More Extra Stage.

beatmania IIDX 14 GOLD saw the return of the standard ES and OMES songs, alongside another multiple Extra Stage system. The setup of having two systems per game (standard system and e-AMUSEMENT system) continued until beatmania IIDX 18 Resort Anthem, where the standard ES and OMES stood alongside a new song unlock system tied to a player's e-AMUSEMENT pass. beatmania IIDX 19 Lincle brought back the multiple Extra Stage system, in the form of Lincle Kingdom, while retaining the standard ES and OMES setup. beatmania IIDX 20 tricoro replaces the standard Extra Stage with "LIMIT BURST", which allows seven different Extra Stage songs to be played. There are no One More Extra Stages for LIMIT BURST, and so far, the only OMES was Plan 8, part of tricoros first song unlock system, LEGEND CROSS.

Most Extra Stage songs debut in their respective Beatmania IIDX games, but there are some Extra Stage songs (esp. from the multiple Extra Stage systems) that are crossovers from other BEMANI titles; for example, tricoros LIMIT BURST system is largely made up of notably difficult songs from other games. Examples include "neu" from pop'n music 15 ADVENTURE, "JOMANDA" from jubeat copious, and "New Decade" from Dance Dance Revolution X2, which got a specially cut version of the song for its IIDX chart.

History
In 1997, Konami distributed its Games & Music Division's (G.M.D.) Beatmania in Japan as a DJ-themed arcade title, significantly influencing rhythm games. Its surprise success influenced the developer to rename itself Bemani, a portmanteau of "Beatmania", and the studio made several spinoffs following its release, including Pop'n Music and Dance Dance Revolution. Bemani initially conceived and developed Beatmania IIDX as a sequel to Beatmania, and Konami released it in Japan in 1999. The development team designed the game to simulate the experience of an actual DJ performing music at a real venue, and gave it a "club Visual Jockey feel." While its predecessor used five keys, IIDXs controller had seven of them. The controller was integrated into the game's Bemani Twinkle cabinet along with a large 40-inch widescreen monitor, massive speakers, and eight spotlights.

The original IIDX gained a post-release reception from video game publications. Neil Foster, writing for the website Hardcore Gaming 101, stated that with the addition of a widescreen monitor, the upper keys were made easier to identify. He called the game "a rocky start" for the Beatmania IIDX series, since it had music from Beatmanias first two iterations (1st Mix and 2nd Mix) paired with new tracks and remixes. According to Foster, many players were initially not impressed with performing old songs on upgraded hardware, so they switched to Beatmania 4th Mix. Bryn Williams of GameSpy found IIDX to be harder than the original Beatmania, because songs that take advantage of its seven keys have more notes than those made for five keys. IGN's Chris Roper wrote that it was successful because of its distinctive and responsive controller. He opinioned that the controller was imperfectly designed, yet its implementation made the game a rare experience.

Bemani developed several updates to the game after its release. Konami decided to link Beatmania IIDX Club Version (later Substream) cabinets with Dance Dance Revolution 2ndMix machines for simultaneous play, leading to increased success. In late 1999, the publisher hired artist Goli to design graphics and characters for Beatmania IIDX 2nd Style. The next game in the IIDX series, 3rd Style, featured a new aesthetic and was ported to the PlayStation 2. In 2002, 8th Style was released after the discontinuation of the original five-key Beatmania. Foster said the updates popularized the game to the point that it overshadowed Beatmania, and IIDX earned more new songs and became known for being very difficult. A sequel with a five-key controller, Beatmania III, was released in 2000.

A video game named Beatmania was released in North America in 2006. In 2015, a PC release titled beatmania IIDX INFINITAS was announced, and began alpha testing in September. On January 29, 2020, Heroic Verses LIGHTNING MODEL cabinets received a North American release. On August 5, 2020, a new version of Infinitas was released. This new version is similar to the Lightning upgrade for arcade releases, having support for 120 Hz displays and an improved engine.

Hardware

The beatmania IIDX cabinet has many standard features that are found in traditional arcade cabinets such as a widescreen display, powerful speakers, and start buttons. Also, unique to IIDX cabinets are the effector buttons and sliders, a bass platform transducer, marquee, and DJ simulating controller. The effector buttons and sliders allow the player to control the volume levels within the game and manipulate the music by adding additional sound effects. The bass platform vibrates beneath the player's feet to the beat of the music being played. The marquee is a series of sixteen-segment display LEDs, used to display game information and scores during gameplay.

Controller information

beatmania IIDX controls consist two sets of seven keys on each player's side, along with two turntables. The turntable for the left player's side is to the left of the keys, while the one on the right player's side is to the right.

Each set of keys is arranged in a pattern of four white keys beneath three black keys. The black keys are offset from the white keys so that each pair of adjacent white keys has a black key above and in between them. This arrangement mimics the F, F#, G, G#, A, A#, B keys on a musical keyboard, though beatmania keys, being about twice as long as they are wide, do not resemble piano keys. The keys are commonly numbered 1 through 7, from left to right. The four white keys are numbered 1, 3, 5, and 7; the three black keys are numbered 2, 4, 6.

As of Cannon Ballers, two cameras are installed, one on the metal cage pointing to the controls and other at left pointing to the players. Initially the game would not boot up if the cameras weren't attached; this was fixed after initial release. As of Rootage, the left camera can read QR codes.

With the release of beatmania IIDX 27 Heroic Verse, a new cabinet called LIGHTNING MODEL was introduced. The effect sliders, LCD marquee and keypads have been replaced with a touchscreen called the Premium Area, located under the screen where the sliders used to be. Due to the removal of the slider panel, the start buttons have been relocated to the upper-left and upper-right of the 1P and 2P keys respectively, and the VEFX and EFFECT buttons are located above the coin slot, as with 5-key beatmania machines. The front of the cabinet also features 3.5mm headphone jacks on each side, although this does not mute the speakers.

As of beatmania IIDX 28 Bistrover, the Premium Area can be used to search for and bookmark specific songs, and can also provide more detailed information about player scores during the current credit.

e-amusement

Since 9th Style, the game has featured integration with Konami's e-amusement platform, which uses a card inserted at the beginning of the game to save stats, scores, allow customization, and track scores in comparison to previous plays and against others over the internet. From 9th Style to Happy Sky (12th), this was by way of a magnetic card and reader. From Distorted onwards the newer type Contactless smartcard Konami e-amusement Pass system has been used. 9th Style did not require an internet connection to use a subset of the e-amusement functionality, but 10th and on required an internet connection to function, which must be provided by a subscription from Konami. Some versions can customize frames, BGM in SELECT MUSIC screen, notes, etc.. e-amusement is not available outside of the primary markets for IIDX (Japan, Asia, and the United States), which has left imported machines outside of Asia without full access to hidden songs and extra stages due to the increasing functionality and integration of e-amusement in more recent styles. However, new songs from e-amusement enabled styles can still be accessed on console versions (which can be imported from Japan) or in INFINITAS. As of Tricoro, required an internet connection to startup instead. As of Rootage, offline kits are returned.

Internal Hardware 
Each game since 9th style runs on a Bemani PC, a custom PC based system designed specifically for Bemani's games. Games prior to 9th style use PlayStation-based hardware called the Bemani Twinkle. As of the newest cabinet model for the "Lightning" cabinet introduced with Beatmania IIDX 27: Heroic Verse, there is an Nvidia GTX 1660, an Intel Core i5 9400F, 8GB of DDR4 RAM, and a 256GB SATA SSD. The cabinets also use a custom amplifier in addition to an Asus Xonar XE sound card, and run a limited version of Windows 10. There is also a 120 Hz main display and a touchscreen second display. Older versions of the cabinets running PC based hardware generally were significantly weaker as they did not have to power 2 displays. The final revision prior to the Lightning Model use Bemani PC ADE-6291, that is powered by an AMD RX-421BD, an R7 Radeon GPU and has 4GB of RAM.

Home versions

Konami also released home versions of IIDX for the PlayStation 2 console in Japan. The home versions are known as CS (consumer software or console) styles, while the arcade versions are known as AC (arcade cabinet or arcade) styles. The CS games can be played with a  DualShock controller or with a special controller from Konami that recreates the arcade experience. Konami manufactures two forms of home controllers, which are known as Konami Official Controllers (KOC) and Arcade Style Controllers (ASC). The KOC, pictured above, is much cheaper than the ASC, but is smaller than the ASC. In addition, KOCs look very different from ASCs and have a smaller space between the turntable and the keys. Konami purports the ASCs to be "arcade-accurate," in that they both resemble and feel like a controller on an arcade machine. For example, the controller itself is much larger and has the turntable further away from the keys. Both styles have a detachable key panel that can be placed to the left or the right of the turntable as the player desires. Aftermarket controllers are also readily available, often containing lit turntables and keys, as well as including microswitch based keys which are meant to closely mimic or be exactly like the ones used in the arcade.

Each CS style corresponds to an AC style of the game and usually contains every song that debuted on its respective AC style. However, some songs have copyright issues with CS, mobile or Infinitas releases. In addition, CS styles may feature a selection of "revivals" - songs that appeared on previous AC or CS styles, "preview songs" - songs that appear on AC styles that do not yet have corresponding CS styles, and "CS exclusive" songs that appear only on CS styles. As of October 2009, CS versions of 3rd Style through Empress have been released (note that 3rd CS contains songs from 1st through 3rd AC; thus, there are no 1st style, 2nd style, or Substream CS titles); additionally, there is a PC title, Beatmania IIDX Infinitas, that doesn't correspond to any AC style however, is very closely related to Sirius in look and feel. Infinitas was initially released in 2015, and upgraded in 2020 to a new version with 120 Hz capabilities.

From October 1998 to March 31, 2007, Beatmanias PlayStation ports sold more than one million copies.

Music
Music is an integral part of the beatmania IIDX series. Featuring a wide selection of genres and artists, both licensed and in-house, the Beatmania IIDX series is well known for its original music. Konami produces an original soundtrack of each game, usually a few months after release, due to the appeal of the music. Konami also releases original albums by Beatmania IIDX artists through its online store, Konamistyle. It's also a tradition that Konami crossovers some songs from and into other Bemani games such as Pop'n Music, Dance Dance Revolution, and Sound Voltex.

Each new AC release typically features around 60-100 new songs (+100 since Rootage), with a selection of songs returning from previous versions and some songs having LEGGENDARIA charts. The current release, beatmania IIDX 29 CastHour, features a library of over 1500 songs. Some songs are split across difficulties or styles. CS releases feature all of the new songs of their corresponding AC versions (with limited exceptions), 5-10 CS exclusive songs, around 25 "revival" (returning) songs, and 1-3 preview songs, for a total of around 60-100 songs (Empress uses 2 discs, each with 99 songs per disc). Arcade versions since 9th Style run on Bemani PC, rather than the PlayStation-based Bemani Twinkle, allowing them to have more songs with higher quality sound due to larger hard drives and higher end hardware.

Songs often include music videos when played, although only some songs contain dedicated videos. Some songs contain generic videos shared by multiple songs, and some of these have additional animated graphics overlaid atop them. Beginning with beatmania IIDX 19 Lincle, players can select Qpro characters or customize them, and some songs show Qpros as part of overlays (exc. in beatmania IIDX Infinitas, due to Qpros being unsupported). Beginning with beatmania IIDX 20 tricoro, overlays of some songs were removed, and in beatmania IIDX 9th Style, the effector system is not available, both due to hardware limitations. Beginning with beatmania IIDX 25 CANNON BALLERS, the effector system is expanded to 8 effect options, adjunt with EQ ONLY. In mobile games and in beatmania IIDX Infinitas (2015), the effector system is disabled.

Releases

The beatmania IIDX series has been released in the home video game market in addition to its arcade releases. To date, the only video game system to have seen a IIDX game is the Sony PlayStation 2. There are currently fourteen games that have been released for the Japanese PlayStation 2, 3 mobile games, one PC game (beatmania IIDX Infinitas) and one game for the American PlayStation 2 (beatmania).

Arcade versions of beatmania IIDX have been imported to the United States from Japan during its lifetime. However, beginning with beatmania IIDX 27 HEROIC VERSE in LIGHTNING MODEL cabinet format, the game has seen a dedicated North American build specifically for use in the United States, due to the increasing presence of Round One arcades.

IIDX 11 IIDXRED
Beatmania IIDX11: IIDXRED (with RED standing for "Revolutionary Energetic Diversification") is the 11th game in the beatmania IIDX series of music video games. It was released in arcades by Konami in 2004. The game features many new songs, some of which are unlocked over Konami's e-Amusement platform. As suggested by the title, IIDXRED's color scheme is red and black, and was one of the first versions to not use the word "style" to denote its version and have a legitimate theme (a pattern that would continue on later versions).

Beatmania IIDX tasks the player with performing songs through a controller consisting of seven key buttons and a scratchable turntable. Hitting the notes with strong timing increases the score and groove gauge bar, allowing the player to finish the stage. Failing to do so depletes the gauge until it is empty, abruptly ending the song.

The core gameplay remains the same in IIDX RED. A new rating, a flashing 8 was added to the difficulty scale. The unused side of the screen during single-player play is now used to house a score graph, containing a real-time comparison of the current player against the high scores.

Home version
The PlayStation 2 version of IIDX RED was released in Japan on May 18, 2006. It was First Title that Developed by Konami Digital Entertainment. It contains all the new songs, plus a selection of new songs and revivals from other mixes. The game also features 2 songs from the US Beatmania game (Toxic and You Really Got Me) with new Another charts. One of the revivals, Gambol, received another chart, although it is rated an 8 - it is exactly the same as the Light7 and 7-keys charts, with the only differences between the difficulty levels being increasingly strict timing windows, with Another containing very strict timing windows. It is considered to be a tribute to previous issues with the song's timing windows in previous versions (Gambol's problems were however fixed on Beatmania IIDX 12: Happy Sky).

IIDX 12: Happy Sky
Beatmania IIDX 12: Happy Sky (stylized as beatmania IIDX12: HAPPY SKY) was released in arcades by Konami in 2005. The game features over 45 new songs, some of which are unlocked over Konami's e-Amusement platform. Happy Sky introduced several small but significant changes to the series, such as a new difficulty scale, and a new boss song.

If the player gets AA's on all stages (with all 3 stages being played on Hard Mode and on Another difficulty, and the final stage being a 10), the player is awarded a chance to play the extra stage, where Scream Squad by Calf is offered. If a AAA is scored and the stage is played on Hard Mode, the player gets to play One More Extra Stage, 冥 (Mei) by Amuro vs Killer, a song rated 12 on Another.

Noted songs
Mei, the OMES of Happy Sky, is known for its Another chart, which is rated 12 on Another and contains exactly 2000 notes. It was once considered one of the most difficult songs in IIDX history, and is still notoriously difficult to clear in HARD mode due to the slowdown and speed up in the middle portion. Xepher gained more exposure outside of IIDX when it was one of several new IIDX crossovers featured in Dance Dance Revolution SuperNOVA, and later as part of a set of Bemani crossover unlocks in Toy's March 2 (which also included Mei). Scripted Connection sounds slightly different on each difficulty level, thus having 3 different "versions". DJ Murasame stated in a "bio" page for the song on Konami's Happy Sky microsite, that the 3 different versions could be played together one after the other at once, and suggested a situation where all 3 versions could be played sequentially using 3 IIDX cabinets next to each other. The console version of Happy Sky would later include all 3 variations playable separately, and a long mix of all 3.

IIDX 13: Distorted
Beatmania IIDX 13: Distorted (stylized as beatmania IIDX13: DistorteD) was released in arcades by Konami in 2006. The game features a total of 55 new songs, some of which are unlocked over Konami's e-Amusement platform. Distorted's interface is a refresh of Happy Sky's interface, but using a monotone color scheme with orange wireframe patterns in menu backgrounds.

Cardinal Gate
Unlike previous versions of IIDX, Distorted features 4 different extra stages in a setup known as the Cardinal Gate. The system is based on the Four Symbols in Chinese mythology. The 4 main songs are identified by their artists in the menu, and are done under aliases of the main IIDX artists. The 4 songs are Contract by 朱雀 (Suzaku), Ganymede by 玄武 (Genbu), waxing and wanding by 青龍 (Seiryuu), and 華蝶風雪 (Kachoufuusetsu) by 白虎 (Byakko). The One More Extra Stage for Distorted is 嘆きの樹 (Nageki no Ki) by 金獅子 (Kinjishi). The OMES is accessed by A'ing all the other songs on Another with Hard Mode enabled.

To access it, one must get a B or higher on the first stage, and get another B or higher on the second stage (with the second song being of equal or higher difficulty than the first). On the last stage, the player must either full combo a 5 or 6-leveled song, finish a level 7 song with a full Groove Gauge, or pass any song with an 8 or higher.

The system is not used on machines in "beat#2" mode (which unlocks all songs). All of the Cardinal Gate song feature different frames for the gameplay interface. When a Cardinal Gate song was beaten, its corresponding frame would be unlocked to use in regular play using Konami's IIDX mobile site.

IIDX 14: Gold
Beatmania IIDX 14: Gold (stylized as beatmania IIDX14: GOLD), the 14th game, was released in arcades by Konami Digital Entertainment on February 21, 2007. The game features over 45 new songs, some of which are unlocked over Konami's e-Amusement platform. The game instituted another hardware change for IIDX, now running on more powerful hardware using Windows XP Embedded as its operating system. The user interface features a predominantly metallic appearance, with gold and silver accents throughout.

North American location test
Gold was the first version of Beatmania IIDX to have a dedicated English build for the North American market. As with other music video games, Japanese IIDX machines have been imported by some arcades, but are still considered rare. This is not the first time a Beatmania IIDX game has been released in North America though, as a Beatmania game based on 9th Style, featuring songs from IIDX, and the original Beatmania games, were released for the PlayStation 2 in 2006. These did not have an arcade counterpart.

The build was first seen at a location test at Brunswick Zone Naperville in Naperville, Illinois. Most of the instructions in the interface were translated into English, though Dan mode was untranslated, and song titles were not translated or romanized (although the LED marquee does show titles in a romanized format on all styles by default). The English build of IIDX Gold was never released.

IIDX 15: DJ Troopers

Beatmania IIDX 15: DJ Troopers, the 15th game, was released in arcades by on December 19, 2007, and a version for the PlayStation 2 was released on December 18, 2008. The game features over 50 new songs, some of which are unlocked over Konami's e-Amusement platform. The overall motif of DJ Troopers is a military themed style, containing rustic greens, grays, and camouflage patterns.

See also
Beatmania
Beatmania III

Notes and references

Footnotes

Citations

Bibliography

External links
Beatmania IIDX Gateway 

Outphase, fan news site
Solid State Squad, American-based Beatmania IIDX scorekeeping site.
Beatmania IIDX Notecharts 
IDX13 home page 
IIDX Gateway 
RemyWiki

1999 video games
Konami franchises
Turntable video games